Rokautskyia scaposa is a species of flowering plant in the family Bromeliaceae, endemic to Brazil (the state of Espírito Santo). It was first described in 1978 as Cryptanthus scaposus.

References

scaposa
Flora of Brazil
Plants described in 1978